The 2019 Major League Baseball All-Star Game was the 90th Major League Baseball All-Star Game. The game was hosted by the Cleveland Indians and was played at Progressive Field on July 9, 2019, with the American League prevailing over the National League, 4–3.	
	
The decision to name Cleveland the host city was announced on January 27, 2017, by Major League Baseball Commissioner Rob Manfred. It was the sixth All-Star Game in Cleveland, and the first since 1997; this established the Indians as the team to have hosted the most All-Star Games, breaking a four-way tie with the Pittsburgh Pirates, St. Louis Cardinals, and Cincinnati Reds, who have each hosted the game five times. It was also the first time since 2014 that an American League team has hosted the event. That All-Star Game also coincided with the 25th anniversary of Progressive Field and made it the second All-Star Game hosted by that ballpark. 

Alex Cora of the defending World Series champion Boston Red Sox managed the American League, and Dave Roberts of the Los Angeles Dodgers managed the National League for the second consecutive year. The Houston Astros once again led all of baseball with a record six players selected to the All-Star roster, including four starters.

Host selection

Bidding for the 2019 All-Star Game began roughly five years before in 2014, according to Indians owner Paul Dolan. The selection of Cleveland to host the 2019 All-Star Game was heavily influenced by three major factors. The first involves recent improvement and growth throughout downtown Cleveland. The second factor is the recent success enjoyed by the Indians which culminated in an appearance in the 2016 World Series. Commissioner Manfred spoke highly of the city and its response to the World Series, stating that, "Cleveland's a baseball town and it will be a great host for the Midsummer Classic." Recent renovations and improvements in Progressive Field were the third factor influencing the decision to name the ballpark as the All-Star Game host for the second time.

This marked the sixth time the Indians have hosted the All-Star Game, more than any other team. Likewise, this is the sixth All-Star Game played in Cleveland, the third most All-Star Games hosted by any city, only trailing New York (nine games hosted by four teams) and Chicago (seven games hosted by two teams).

Fan balloting
Voting for the All-Star game was changed from previous years. "Primary" voting lasted from on May 28 to June 21. The "primary" determined the top three vote-getters at every infield position and top nine vote-getters in the outfield for both the American and National Leagues. From this group of finalists, fans determined the All-Star Game starters. Voting ran from June 26 to June 27.

Unlike the format from previous years, which allowed fans to vote on a standard ballot up to 35 times, they could vote up to five times per day during the "primary" but only once during the final voting which determined the starting lineups. The "Starters Election" winners are highlighted below.

The remainder of the rosters, including all pitchers, were selected by player vote and input from both managers.

Full rosters were announced on June 30.

Rosters

National League

American League

Roster notes

Brandon Lowe was named as the roster replacement for Tommy La Stella due to injury.
José Berríos was named as the roster replacement for Jake Odorizzi due to injury.
Gleyber Torres was named as the roster replacement for Brandon Lowe due to injury.
Xander Bogaerts was named as the roster replacement for Hunter Pence due to injury.
J. D. Martinez was named starter in place of Hunter Pence due to injury.
Max Muncy was named as the roster replacement for Anthony Rendon due to injury.
Shane Bieber was named as the roster replacement for Mike Minor due to Minor starting on Sunday.
Liam Hendriks was named as the roster replacement for Charlie Morton due to Morton starting on Sunday.
Masahiro Tanaka was named as the roster replacement for Marcus Stroman due to injury.
Sonny Gray was named as the roster replacement for Max Scherzer due to injury.
Felipe Vázquez was named as the roster replacement for Zack Greinke due to Greinke dealing with a personal matter.
Brandon Woodruff was named as the roster replacement for Josh Hader due to injury.
#: Indicates player would not play (replaced as per reference notes above).

Game summary

Starting lineup

Line score

Logo
The Indians and Major League Baseball unveiled the electric guitar inspired logo for the 2019 All-Star Game on August 7, 2018.

See also

 List of Major League Baseball All-Star Games
 Major League Baseball All-Star Game Most Valuable Player Award
 All-Star Futures Game
 Home Run Derby

References

External links
 

Major League Baseball All-Star Game
All-Star
Baseball competitions in Cleveland
2010s in Cleveland
Major League Baseball
2019 Major League Baseball All-Star Game